Oliver Tichy (born 6 May 1975) is an Austrian former racing driver from Vienna.

After a successful youth karting career, Tichy moved to the German Formula Ford championship in 1992 and to the EFDA Formula Ford 1600 Championship in 1993 where he finished fifth. In 1993 he also raced in Formula Ford 1800 Germany, winning three times. In 1994 he made his professional debut in the German Formula Three Championship, however, he only scored 5 points and finished 24th in the championship. In 1995 he stayed in German F3 but switched from Volkswagen to Opel and improved to 11th in points. He moved up to International Formula 3000 in 1996 with the RSM Marko team and finished tenth in points, finishing on the podium in third at the season finale at Hockenheimring. Tichy returned to the series in 1997 with Pacific Racing. He finished a career-best second at the Helsinki Thunder round but left the team after eight races. He returned to the series with the Coloni Motorsport team for the season finale at Circuito de Jerez and delivered by again finishing in second place on the podium. He finished seventh in the championship despite missing a race. He was away from racing after that until midway through the 1998 season when he returned to the Coloni team. He failed to score points in any of his races with Coloni in 1998. Tichy's final professional race appearance came in 2001 when he appeared in a single race in the FIA GT Championship.

External links

1975 births
Austrian racing drivers
Sportspeople from Vienna
German Formula Three Championship drivers
International Formula 3000 drivers
FIA GT Championship drivers
Living people
Opel Team BSR drivers
Scuderia Coloni drivers
RSM Marko drivers